Kinistino  is a town in Saskatchewan, Canada. Kinistino is situated in north-central Saskatchewan. It lies on rich agricultural soil in the valley of the Carrot River, which flows a mile east of the town.

The marketing area of Kinistino includes parts of the rural municipalities of Kinistino #459, Flett Springs #429, and Invergordon #430, plus the James Smith First Nation. Although the market area along the Highway 3 is not that large to either the east or west, as one continues north and south of the town a fanning-out process occurs. This puts the area of marketing for Kinistino at somewhere near .

Geography
The Town of Kinistino rests upon a bedrock of shale in an area of maximum glacial lake coverage.

Kinistino is located in the Aspen parkland biome. The immediate area is one of moderate rolling hills and level stretches. The excellent soil is interspersed occasionally with bluffs of aspen and some sloughs. To the southwest lies the Waterhen Marsh and Lake (now drained and utilized for various farming purposes), while to the north approximately  the Saskatchewan River and the Forks of the North and South branches provide a beautiful spot of coniferous forest growth.

Climate
Like in the rest of Saskatchewan, Kinistino experiences a high variance in the seasonal temperatures. However, Kinistino is not in an area of high storm activity and usually experiences only 3 blizzards per year (as compared to Saskatoon 7, and Qu'Appelle 14). Fewer thunderstorms are experienced in Kinistino than in the south of Saskatchewan.

The frost-free period extends, on a 30-year average, from June 1 to September 6; hours of sunshine amount to 2,280. The precipitation averages are: rain ; and snowfall .

Demographics 

Government 

 Kinistino (Saskatchewan provincial electoral district), formerly used

See also 

 List of communities in Saskatchewan
List of place names in Canada of Indigenous origin
 List of towns in Saskatchewan

References

External links 

Towns in Saskatchewan
Kinistino No. 459, Saskatchewan
Division No. 15, Saskatchewan